Prospectors is a weekly American reality television series that aired from March 26, 2013, to February 14, 2016, on The Weather Channel. The show follows miners in the Colorado Rocky Mountains as they search for precious metals and gemstones.

Cast
 Amanda Adkins is a miner with over 20 years' experience. She is originally from Capon Bridge, West Virginia, where she learned how to mine by watching her 'Great Uncle, Oakley Adkins' (Edited By Caleb Adkins). She was also briefly a model, and even turned down modelling in France in order to continue mining gemstones. On April 24, 2013, she began working with her mining partner Travis Anderson. Travis was Steve Brancato's mining partner on season 1 (Who discovered Diane's Pocket, and lived with Amanda Adkins for a month before the filming of season 1) of Prospectors. On April 27, 2014, Amanda began hosting segments on a Jewelry Television special about American gem stones. In April 2015 Amanda removed 'Anderson' from her last name on her Facebook page because they were no longer a "common law" couple. According to Amanda, it will be announced on the new season she has split with mining partner and former partner Travis Anderson. In 2016, Amanda Adkins launched a website of exclusively USA mined gems, mineral specimens and jewelry that not only she dug herself, but also years of combined mining efforts from across the United States of America of gemstone mining families to bring genuine, natural gems, minerals and jewelry to the market. This a new niche in the market as of 2016 as a collaborative effort to bring American mined gemstones to the market from a network of USA mining teams. Amanda Adkins launched this website in an effort to help the gemstone mining families in America.
 Dwayne Hall mines aquamarine on Colorado's Mount White. He is originally from Kentucky, where he learned woodcarving. Dwayne came in second place in a world championship for woodcarving. After traveling around the country with his wife he decided to move to Colorado, where he began mining.
 Rich Fretterd has a combined total of 19 years' experience in mining, milling and surveying in Colorado. He is originally from Hudson, New York. Fretterd mines with his girlfriend and mining partner Jean Cowman. At his Godsend Claim, he found a U.S. record-breaking-sized smoky quartz crystal 4 ½ feet in length. Fretterd pleaded guilty to child sex charges in November 2018.
 The Busse family – Brian & Yolanda Busse mine aquamarine on Mount Antero with their sons, Brian Jr, David, Chris, Nathan, and Elijah. Brian has solely supported his family through prospecting since 1987. The Busse family has saved people from hypothermia, rollovers and other accidents.
 The Dorris family – Joe Dorris mines amazonite and smoky quartz. He is married to Susan Dorris and has three children, Scott, Tim, and Krystle, who help with the business. Scott isn't filmed on Prospectors. Joe, Tim, and Krystle are filmed mining on their claims. Tim is responsible for cleaning, and repairing specimens. Krystle attends gem shows and promotes the gems and jewelry. In addition to mining, Joe Dorris is an author. He has written and published three books and written a few articles on minerals and mining.
 The Cardwell family – Craig and Tracy Cardwell mine on Mount Antero. They have 16 claims from the South Knob to the Mount White Basin. Craig is the fourth generation in his family to mine on Mount Antero. Craig's grandfather, Grady, used a Caterpillar D9 to make a road to the top of Mount Antero.
 Charles (Chuck) Diehl Borland III – Helped behind the scenes for many years, driving up from Bozeman, Montana.  He never wanted to be on camera, but just wanted to be a part of what was going on at the dig site.  He passed away from pancreatic cancer on Nov. 4, 2013.  In addition to being interested in mining, he taught ninth-grade earth science in the Bozeman public-school system for 36 years, from 1968 to 2004, and inspired many youngsters to further study the beauty and complexity of the Earth and its treasures.  He was a "go-to" expert for identifying field specimens and was at his happiest when talking about science and mineralogy with anyone who asked.  When he died, he was 73 years old and left behind three children; the youngest was named Crystal Gem Borland.

Episodes

Season 1 (2013)

Season 2 (2013)

Season 2 Specials (2013)

Season 3 (2014–2015)

Season 4 (2015–2016)

Permits
In August 2013, a hearing was held before the Colorado Mined Land Reclamation Board to address the issue of reclamation permits. Steve Brancato and Amanda Adkins appeared at the hearing. Brancato is fighting state permitting requirements. Adkins stated she didn't realize she needed the permit and agreed to file for one for her Last Laugh claim. Fretterd and Busse were also ordered to get reclamation permits, but reached an agreement with the state before the hearing.

References

The Weather Channel original programming
2010s American reality television series
2013 American television series debuts
2016 American television series endings